Aleksandra Aleksandrovna Kiryashova (born 21 August 1985 in Leningrad, Soviet Union) is a Russian pole vaulter. Her personal best jump is 4.65 metres.

Achievements

External links 
 

1985 births
Living people
Athletes from Saint Petersburg
Russian female pole vaulters
World Athletics Championships athletes for Russia
Universiade medalists in athletics (track and field)
Universiade gold medalists for Russia
Competitors at the 2013 Summer Universiade
Medalists at the 2007 Summer Universiade
Medalists at the 2011 Summer Universiade